Gérard Marc Joseph Marie de Piolenc (30 November 1908 – 2 August 1979) was a French sailor. He competed in the mixed 6 metres at the 1936 Summer Olympics.

References

1908 births
1979 deaths
Sportspeople from Indre-et-Loire
Olympic sailors of France
Sailors at the 1936 Summer Olympics – 6 Metre
French male sailors (sport)